John Page King (April 13, 1909 — June 13, 1982) was an American politician who served in the Hawaii House of Representatives from 1949 to 1955, representing the 4th legislative district of Hawaii as a Republican.

Early life and education
King was born in Richmond, Virginia on April 13, 1909. He attended the University of Hawaii, graduating with a Bachelor of Arts.

Career
King was an official with the territorial office of civil defense during World War II.

King served in the Hawaii House of Representatives from 1949 to 1955, representing the 4th legislative district of Hawaii as a Republican. He was succeeded by Russell K. Kono.

Personal life
In 1933, King married Louise Dickson, with whom he had three daughters.

King died at the age of 73 in Mililani, Hawaii on June 13, 1982.

References

1909 births
1982 deaths
20th-century American politicians
Republican Party members of the Hawaii House of Representatives
Politicians from Richmond, Virginia
University of Hawaiʻi at Mānoa alumni